Tina Lee is CEO of  T&T Supermarket, the largest Canadian grocery retail chain that sells Asian goods. She took over from her mother, Cindy Lee, in 2014. T&T is named after Tina and her sister, Tiffany. Lee is a second-generation Taiwanese Canadian.

Lee is a senior advisory board member for NAAAP Toronto. She has also been named to the United States-Canada Council for the Advancement of Women Entrepreneurs and Business Leaders. She was a co-recipient, along with her mother, of the Canadian Grand Prix Trailblazer Lifetime Achievement Award. Lee was also named Executive of the Year at Ascend Canada’s fifth annual Leadership Awards Gala.

References

Living people
Canadian retail chief executives
Canadian women in business
University of Western Ontario alumni
Year of birth missing (living people)
Canadian women business executives
Canadian people of Chinese descent
Canadian people of Taiwanese descent